Prince Eugen Napoleon Nicolaus of Sweden and Norway, Duke of Närke (1 August 1865 – 17 August 1947) was a Swedish painter, art collector, and patron of artists.

Background 

Prince Eugen was born at Drottningholm Palace as the fourth and youngest son of Prince Oscar, Duke of Östergötland. His mother was Sophia of Nassau. The newborn prince was granted the title of Duke of Närke. Upon his father's accession to the thrones of Sweden and Norway as King Oscar II, the Duke of Närke became fourth in line to the throne. Showing early artistic promise, he studied in Paris, and went on to become one of Sweden's most prominent landscape painters.  Throughout his life Prince Eugen was a supporter of fellow artists, and also involved in many cultural organisations and committees. A homosexual bachelor, he bequeathed his villa Waldemarsudde at Djurgården in Stockholm, and its collections, to the nation. It is now one of Sweden's most popular museums.

Norway 

The Duke of Närke was a great admirer of Norwegian nature and frequently visited Christiania (later known as Oslo). His letters show that he preferred its artistic milieu to the more constrained Stockholm one. His most notable Norwegian friends were the painters Erik Werenskiold and Gerhard Munthe; he remained attached to them and to Norway until his death.

In 1905, the personal union between Norway and Sweden was broken by the Parliament of Norway. The writer Bjørnstjerne Bjørnson mentioned the possible candidature of Prince Eugen for the throne of Norway. Another writer, Knut Hamsun, had suggested the Prince as a suitable candidate already in 1893. His father, however, refused to allow any of his sons to ascend the Norwegian throne.

Prince Eugen was the only Swede represented at an exhibition in Oslo in 1904. The explanation was that he was a prince of Norway until 1905 and that his relations with the Norwegian artists caused him to be seen as Norwegian until the dissolution of the union.

Art 
After finishing high school, Prince Eugen studied art history at Uppsala University. Although supported by his parents, Prince Eugen did not make the decision to pursue a career in painting easily, not least because of his royal status. He was very open-minded and interested in the radical tendencies of the 1880s. He was first trained in painting by Hans Gude and Wilhelm von Gegerfelt.

Between 1887 and 1889, he studied in Paris under Léon Bonnat, Alfred Philippe Roll, Henri Gervex and Pierre Puvis de Chavannes. Puvis de Chavannes's classical simplicity had the greatest influence on Prince Eugen's work. The Duke devoted himself entirely to landscape painting, becoming one of the era's most prominent landscape painters. He was mainly interested in the lake Mälaren, the countryside of Stockholm (such as Tyresö, where he spent his summers), Västergötland (most notably Örgården, another summer residence) and Skåne (especially Österlen).

Prince Eugen's works

Death and legacy 

Prince Eugen bought Waldemarsudde, on Djurgården in Stockholm, in 1899 and had a residence built there within a few years. After his death at Drottningholm Palace on 17 August 1947, the residence became an art museum and, in accordance with his will, property of the state. Eugen never married, in an era when royal princes almost always found princesses to wed. His homosexual orientation was unknown to the general public.

Honours and arms

Honours 
National honours
 Knight and Commander of the Seraphim, 1 August 1865
 Knight of the Order of Charles XIII, 1 August 1865
 Commander Grand Cross of the Sword, 1 August 1865
 Commander Grand Cross of the Polar Star, 1 August 1865
 Commander Grand Cross of the Order of Vasa, 15 May 1897

Foreign honours

Arms

References

Eugen 1865
Norwegian princes
Dukes of Närke
House of Bernadotte
19th-century Swedish painters
19th-century male artists
Swedish male painters
20th-century Swedish painters
20th-century male artists
Swedish art collectors
1865 births
1947 deaths
LGBT royalty
Knights of the Order of Charles XIII
Commanders Grand Cross of the Order of the Sword
Commanders Grand Cross of the Order of the Polar Star
Grand Crosses of the Order of Vasa
Knights of the Order of the Norwegian Lion
Swedish people of French descent
Recipients of the King Haakon VII Freedom Cross
Honorary Knights Grand Cross of the Royal Victorian Order
Grand Crosses of the Order of Saint Stephen of Hungary
Artists from Stockholm
Swedish Lutherans
Swedish Army colonels
Art Nouveau painters
Knights of the Golden Fleece of Spain
Recipients of the Order of the Netherlands Lion
Grand Crosses of the Order of Saint-Charles
Grand Crosses of the Order of the Star of Romania
Sons of kings